Jakarta Convention Center or JCC is a convention center located in Gelora Bung Karno Sports Complex, Jakarta, Indonesia. It is one of earliest as well as popular convention center in Jakarta. Since its inauguration in 1974 many important national and international conference, exhibition, fair, indoor sports and musical concerts were held at JCC including  11th Non-Aligned Movement Conference and Asian-African Conference It is a very venue place throughout the year.

History
Construction of Jakarta Convention Center complex started in 1960 and was completed in 1974, in time for the opening ceremony of the 23rd annual Pacific Asia Travel Association conference, held in early April 1974. The conference was a major event for Jakarta and several large hotel projects, such as Hotel Indonesia extension, Hotel Borobudur, Hotel Ambassador (now Hotel Aryaduta), and Hotel Sahid Jaya, were also targeted for completion before the PATA conference began.

Facilities
It has a plenary hall that has 5,000 seats. JCC also has an assembly hall with an area of 3,921 square metres. JCC has 13 various sized meeting rooms. JCC is connected to The Sultan Hotel & Residence Jakarta (formerly Jakarta Hilton International) by a tunnel. The tunnel has moving walkways and is air-conditioned.

Sports events
Between mid-2016 and September 2018, JCC was used as the venue of mixed martial arts event ONE Championship for six times. It was also became a temporary venue at the 2017 Indonesia Open, because the Istora Gelora Bung Karno was under renovation for the 2018 Asian Games.

Jakarta Convention Center was used as the location of the media center and International Broadcast Center for 2018 Asian Games. It was also a venue for few indoor matches, as well as Judo, Karate, Ju-jitsu, Kurash, Sambo, and Wrestling.

Notable concerts

References

Cited works

External links

1974 establishments in Indonesia
Buildings and structures in Jakarta
Convention centres in Indonesia
Tourist attractions in Jakarta
Music venues in Indonesia
Central Jakarta
Venues of the 2018 Asian Games
Asian Games judo venues
Asian Games karate venues
Asian Games kurash venues
Asian Games sambo venues
Asian Games wrestling venues